Ricardo Treviño Jr. (born May 16, 1971) is an American country music artist. Signed to Columbia Nashville in 1993, Trevino began his career that year with the release of his debut single "Just Enough Rope", the first mainstream country music single to feature separate English and Spanish versions. The song was included  on his debut album Dos Mundos; a self-titled album followed a year later. Trevino has charted a total of fourteen singles on the Billboard Hot Country Songs chart and recorded seven studio albums. His highest-charting single, "Running Out of Reasons to Run", reached No. 1 on that chart in 1996.

Biography

Early years
Trevino of Mexican descent, is the son of Ricardo Trevino Sr., a Tejano musician, and Linda Chavez. His music career began when he started taking piano lessons at the age of five. He plays rhythm guitar as well as keyboards.

Trevino graduated from Westwood High School in Austin, Texas. Although he was offered a baseball scholarship to Memphis State University, Trevino chose instead to study music at Texas A&M University. While a student, he played his brand of country music in local clubs. In December 1991, a representative of the Sony label, Paul Jarosik, was stranded in Austin due to flooding conditions and visited a small club where Trevino regularly played. Although Trevino was not performing that evening, the representative saw several articles on the walls which praised Trevino. Employees of the club gave him a tape of Trevino's music, which the label representative then passed onto music producer Steve Buckingham. Buckingham made a special trip to Austin just to hear Trevino perform and signed him to Sony. Trevino left school to pursue his music career.

1993: Dos Mundos
At the insistence of Columbia Nashville, his first album, Dos Mundos, was an almost entirely Spanish country album. Trevino, who is not a native Spanish speaker and needed lessons before he could record the album, was displeased with the decision. "I didn't like that a bit because I didn't want people to think I was a Tejano artist...Everybody thinks I'm a Tejano singer crossing over to the country format." The album was certified gold (selling over 500,000 copies).

1993–1995: Rick Trevino
Seven months later, in 1994, Sony released his first English album, Rick Trevino. Rick Trevino was certified gold (selling over 500,000 copies) and featured the hits "She Can't Say I Didn't Cry" and "Doctor Time." He released his debut single, "Just Enough Rope" ("Bastante Cordón") on September 7, 1993. It appeared in English on Rick Trevino and in Spanish on Dos Mundos, while a version of the song which combined the two languages was also released to radio. This became the first mainstream country single to be released in both English and Spanish. The album's third single, "She Can't Say I Didn't Cry", became Trevino's first chart-topper, spending one week at the top of the Gavin Report country singles charts.

1995–1996: Looking for the Light
The follow-up English album, Looking for the Light, was released in 1995 and included the top-ten hit "Bobbie Ann Mason." Trevino also recorded a Spanish version of the album, titled Un Rayo de Luz ("A Ray of Light").

In the late 1990s he joined an all-star group of Mexican-American singers, including members of Los Lobos, Freddy Fender, Ruben Ramos, and Flaco Jimenez, to create the supergoup Los Super Seven. The group won a Grammy in 1998 for Best Mexican-American Music Performance for their self-titled debut album. Another two albums followed – Canto in 2001 (also released live on DVD) and
Heard It On The X in 2005 (both albums included Raul Malo of The Mavericks among others).

1996–1997: Learning as You Go
Trevino's 1996 album Learning as You Go, produced his first and only Billboard Number One single in "Running Out of Reasons to Run" with "Learning As You Go" reaching #1 on the Radio & Records Chart and #2 on the Billboard Country Chart. The third single, "I Only Get This Way With You" reached #7 on the Billboard Country Chart. As with Looking for the Light, Learning As You Go also featured a separate Spanish-language version, titled Mi Vida Eres Tú ("My Life Is You").

1998: Departure from Sony
Trevino asked to leave his contract with Sony in the hopes of moving in a different musical direction. Sony refused to release him from the contract, and Trevino cut a new album and released the single "Only Lonely Me" on August 18, 1998. Before the album could be released, Sony agreed to release Trevino, and the album was shelved. The same year Trevino appeared on compilation CD Tribute To Tradition (released on Columbia label) with a cover version of "City Lights" (#1 country classic recorded by Ray Price in 1958).

1999–2002: Continued touring and Mi Son
Trevino continued to tour and released a Spanish-language album, Mi Son, that contained only ballads and had little hint of his country music roots. Without a new album or record deal, however, Trevino's touring schedule slowed, and most of his band quit.

During this time, Trevino began collaborating with Raul Malo, former frontman of country band The Mavericks. The two had met while working on the second Los Super Seven album. Their collaborations helped bring Trevino to the attention of producer Paul Worley, who helped Trevino get a contract with Warner Brothers.

2002–2004: In My Dreams
For his next album, In My Dreams, Trevino "wanted to do a country record that had a Latin flavor to it." He wrote or cowrote every song on the album except for the final track, a cover of the Bryan Adams song "Have You Ever Really Loved a Woman?" The title track, "In My Dreams" became a single and remained on the charts for twenty weeks, falling just shy of the Top 40 on the Billboard country charts. Trevino was disappointed with the final ranking, but said the album "opened a lot of doors for me. It made people take me a little more seriously than 'Bobbie Ann Mason.

2004–present: Single releases and Whole Town Blue
Trevino's  Warner Records single release, Separate Ways, failed to reach the Top 40 on Billboards Hot Country Songs chart and the planned release of the Whole Town Blue album was cancelled. The album was subsequently released in 2011 on one CD with his previous album on the Warner label as In My Dreams / Whole Town Blue. A Christmas album titled Oh Ven, Emanuel was self-released in 2009 and was still available through his website as of 2016. His collaboration with Los Lobos on "Wasted Days and Wasted Nights" was released as a single in 2010.

Discography

Studio albums

Compilation albums

Notes
A^ Spanish-language albums.
B^''' Rick Trevino'' also charted at number 5 on the US Top Heatseekers chart.

Singles

Music videos

References

External links
Rick Trevino Official Website
Rick Trevino Artist Roster

1971 births
American country keyboardists
American country pianists
American male pianists
American country singer-songwriters
American male singer-songwriters
Living people
Texas A&M University alumni
Singer-songwriters from Texas
Musicians from Houston
American musicians of Mexican descent
Columbia Records artists
Spanish-language singers of the United States
21st-century American singers
Country musicians from Texas
21st-century American pianists
21st-century American male singers